Abergarwed is a village in the Welsh county borough of Neath Port Talbot, south Wales.

It is located in the Vale of Neath, in the electoral ward of Resolven, near the town of Neath.

External links 
www.geograph.co.uk : photos of Abergarwed and surrounding area

Villages in Neath Port Talbot
Vale of Neath